Feidlimid mac Coirpri Chruimm was a supposed king of Munster from the Glendamnach branch of the Eoganachta. Not mentioned as king in the Annals or the Book of Leinster, he is mentioned in the Laud Synchronisms as successor to his father Coirpre Cromm mac Crimthainn (died 577). However, the other references mention Feidlimid mac Tigernaig as king. According to the historians T. M. Charles-Edwards and F. J. Byrne, these lists seem to favour the Glendamnach line and may be artificial.

Notes

See also
Kings of Munster

References

T.M.Charles-Edwards, Early Christian Ireland
Francis J.Byrne, Irish Kings and High-Kings
Book of Leinster,{MS folio 150a} Fland cecinit.
Laud Synchronisms

External links
CELT: Corpus of Electronic Texts at University College Cork

Kings of Munster
590s deaths
6th-century Irish monarchs
Year of birth unknown